Jacob Ericsson (born 17 September 1993) is a Swedish footballer who plays for IF Karlstad as a defender.

References

External links

1993 births
Living people
Swedish footballers
Sweden youth international footballers
Association football defenders
AIK Fotboll players
Örgryte IS players
Karlstad BK players
Gefle IF players
Falkenbergs FF players
Superettan players
Allsvenskan players
Ettan Fotboll players